Blood money may refer to:

 Blood money (restitution), money paid to the family of a murder victim

Films 
 Blood Money (1917 film), a film starring Harry Carey
 Blood Money (1921 film), a British-Dutch film
 Blood Money (1933 film), a film starring George Bancroft
 Blood Money (1957 film), a made for TV drama directed by Ralph Nelson
 Blood Money (1974 film) or The Stranger and the Gunfighter, a kung fu Spaghetti Western
 Blood Money (1980 film), a film starring Bryan Brown
 Blood Money (1983 film), a film starring Chow Yun-fat 
 Blood Money (1988 film), an alternate title for Clinton and Nadine
 Blood Money (1996 film), a film starring Traci Lords
 Blood Money (1997 film), a Nollywood film directed by Chico Ejiro 
 Blood Money (1999 film), a film written and directed by, and starring, Michael Ironside
 Blood Money (2000 film), directed by Aaron Lipstadt, starring Brian Bloom and Jenya Lano
 Blood Money (2008 film) or Fist of the Warrior, an American martial arts/crime film
 Blood Money (2010 film), a documentary discussing abortion from the business point of view
 Blood Money (2012 film), a Bollywood film starring Kunal Khemu and Amrita Puri
 Blood Money (2012 Australian film), an Australian film directed by Gregory McQualter
 Blood Money (2016 film), directed by Luke White, starring Klariza Clayton, Ollie Barbieri and Scott Chambers
 Blood Money (2016 short film), directed by Jamil Dehlavi
 Blood Money (2017 film), directed by Lucky McKee and starring John Cusack
 Blood Money (2021 film), a Tamil film directed by Sarjun KM

Music 
 Blood Money (Lord Infamous album), 2009
 Blood Money (Mobb Deep album), 2006
 Blood Money (Tom Waits album), 2002
 "Bloodmoney", a song by Poppy
 Blood Money, an album by Lil' O
 "Blood Money", a song by Darlia
 "Blood Money", a song by Eyehategod from Confederacy of Ruined Lives
 "Blood Money", a song by Jon Bon Jovi from Blaze of Glory
 "Blood Money", a song by DJ Khaled fromWe Global
 "Blood Money", a song by Overkill from Horrorscope
 "Blood Money", a song by The Sisters of Mercy, a non-album B-side from First and Last and Always
 "Blood Money", a song by Zion I from Chapter 4
 "Damned for All Time"/"Blood Money", a song from the rock opera Jesus Christ Superstar
 "Blood Money", a song by The Church from the album Starfish
 "Blood Money", a song by April Wine from the album Power Play

Television 
 Blood Money (TV series), a 1981 British television series
 "Blood Money" (Angel), a 2001 episode of Angel
 "Blood Money" (Breaking Bad), a 2013 episode of the fifth season of Breaking Bad
 "Blood Money" (Law & Order), a 1999 episode of Law & Order

Video games 
 Blood Money (video game), a 1989 Amiga computer game
 Hitman: Blood Money, a 2006 video game by IO Interactive

See also